Juncus capitatus is a species of rush known by the common names dwarf rush and leafybract dwarf rush. It is native to Europe, Asia and North Africa. It is also an introduced species in parts of North America such as California and the Gulf Coast. It grows in moist areas, such as wet sand, vernal pools, and ditches.

Description
The dwarf rush is a small annual herb not exceeding ten centimeters in height. The stems are erect and thready, flat or somewhat corrugated. The leaves are basal and up to 3 or 4 centimeters long. The plant is green to red or brownish in color. Each stem bears an inflorescence of up to six clustered flowers. The pointed bracts at the base of the inflorescence are often over a centimeter long, longer the flower cluster itself, and are somewhat leaflike, giving the species its common name. Each flower has pointed outer tepals and thinner, shorter, oval-shaped inner tepals. There are three stamens. The fruit is a tiny oval-shaped capsule one to two millimeters long.

Distribution and habitat
The dwarf rush is native to Europe, West Asia and North and East Africa. In the British Isles it is only known from Anglesey, Cornwall and the Channel Islands, and is rare in all these locations. It germinates in autumn and grows in places where water stands in winter and which dry up completely in summer, meaning the plant faces little competition. These locations include rock ledges on sea cliffs, around  outcrops of serpentine rock and in dune slacks. In some locations it has sometimes been thought to be locally extinct, but then reappeared later.

References

External links
Jepson Manual Treatment
Photo gallery

capitatus
Flora of Europe
Flora of Asia
Flora of North Africa
Plants described in 1772
Taxa named by Christian Ehrenfried Weigel